The Cisitalia Grand Prix is a single-seater car for the postwar 1.5-litre supercharged Grand Prix class, built by Italian sports car manufacturer Cisitalia and introduced in 1949. It was designed on behalf of Cisitalia by Porsche between 1946–47, and is therefore also known by its Porsche project number, Type 360.

An extremely advanced design, it proved too complex to build for the small Italian firm—leading to a lengthy development and eventually to the financial downfall of the company. Between Cisitalia's 1949 liquidation and the fact that supercharged engines were banned for the 1952 Formula One season, the car never raced.

The Type 360 is also noticeable for using an early form of sequential manual transmission, and was one of the first race cars to do so.

History
The car was commissioned by Piero Dusio in 1946. Dusio paid a large sum of money upfront, part of which was used to free Ferdinand Porsche from the French prison in which he was being held effectively for ransom.  Dusio gave Porsche only 16 months to complete the car which proved too short a time to sort out the advanced design.

Design
The Dr. Porsche designed unraced 1939 1,482.56 cc (53.0 x 56.0 mm) 2-stage Roots supercharged flat-12 Auto-Union had been projected to deliver  at 9,000 rpm. The chassis was of chromoly tubing and featured on/off four-wheel-drive with a sequential gear-shift and a rear-mounted transaxle also sending power through a driveshaft to a front differential. Suspension was independent with Porsche type trailing arms in front and parallel acting arms in the rear. Porsche's experience with the pre-war Auto Union Grand Prix cars showed through in the layout and design of the Cisitalia to the extent that it has been referred to as the "E-Type".

Legacy
By the time the only prototype was finished Dusio was out of cash.  The car languished in development until 1951, at one point being shipped off to Argentina to try to persuade president Juan Perón to invest in the company.  By 1952 Formula One rules had changed and while Dusio attempted to source a 2-liter motor for the car a lack of funds relegated one of the most advanced Grand Prix cars of its day to a few Formula Libre events and quick retirement.  The car is currently on display in the Porsche Museum in Stuttgart.

References

External links

8W The rear-engined revolution: Horses pushing the cart
Cisitalia Museum

Cisitalia
Porsche vehicles
Grand Prix cars